The Louise-Schroeder-Gymnasium is situated in the Allach-Untermenzing district of Munich on Pfarrer-Grimm Street in Bavaria, Germany.

History
The Louise-Schroeder-Gymnasium relocated in the year 1982. The old premises now forms the grounds of the Käthe-Kollwitz-Gymnasium. The school owes its name to Louise Schroeder, SPD Politician and Berlin's Mayor from 1947/48. The new grounds form a school centre, complete with a Grundschule (Grundschule an der Pfarrer-Grimm-Straße), Realschule (Carl-Spitzweg-Realschule), and the Louise-Schroeder-Gymnasium. Around 1000 pupils attend the Louise-Schroeder-Gymnasium, with a staff of approximately 70.

Education
At the Louise-Schroeder-Gymnasium there are two main branches of tuition:

The mathematical/scientific-based branch with English as the first and French as the second foreign language.
The linguistically based branch, with English as a first, Latin as a second, and Italian or French as a third foreign language.

Wind Instrument Studies (Bläserklasse)
Since the school term of 2003/2003 every class of Years 5 and 6 has its own Bläserklasse. This is in addition to the normal musical education at the school as well as separate instrumental tuition, which is done in small groups in the afternoon. As of the school year of 2005/2006, there are two Bläserklassen of Year 5 students.

ICT
The Louise-Schroeder-Gymnasium was one of the first schools in Munich to grant students access to the internet via Broadband. At about the same time, the school also installed its own server where students, teachers, parents, and anyone interested can access various information about the school. Various servers were also added later.

In Autumn 2003 the school network was completely changed, with the rest of Munich following suit. In the course of this conversion, all computers (among other things) were replaced by new devices from T-Systems, as well as configuring the network so that maintenance by "PIK" (Projekt Information Kommunikation) technicians could be completed remotely. Despite this conversion, it has multiple servers alongside Munich's main server due to the high technical demands and requirements of the school.

Since summer 2018 there are no servers running at the LSG because the city forced them to make their server being hosted by their town.

On the server that was administered by the school's own group of administrators (which consists of pupils from almost every year group), every student and teacher has their own space on it, which can be used to their disposal. However, for safety reasons, these spaces can only be seen by fellow students of the school.

For students interested in ICT there is the option of having an account on the Linux server. This server is publicly accessible, and as well as web space, offers PHP and MySQL support.

There are currently four computer rooms with 26, 16, 15, and 10 student workstations respectively. In addition, every classroom is equipped with provisions to access the school network. Video projectors are installed in many classrooms, which can be used by teachers to give presentations; for the remaining classrooms, there are portable projectors available.

Software development
Since 2004/2005 the LSG has used a system utilising PHP and MySQL in order for reservation of the ICT rooms via the internet. This system replaces the previous one of MS Excel tables and was developed by students of the LSG themselves, on the basis of the GPL. This system is also used by the Käthe-Kollwitz-Gymnasium.

The basis of the computer room reservation system was developed into an online management allocation system of the Munich Hochseilgarten. This goes into operation as of 2006.

External links
School Homepage (German)
Elaborate information of the school's history (German)
Computer workstation reservation timetable (German)
Online Management Distribution system for the Hochseilgarten of Munich (German)

Schools in Bavaria
Education in Munich
Educational institutions established in 1983
1983 establishments in Germany